Joachim Giermek (born 1943 in Buffalo, New York) is a former Minister General of the Conventuals (OFM Conv.) and the first to be of Polish ancestry. He was elected in 2001 and served until 2007. He has been involved in Franciscan peace efforts.

References 

Conventual Friars Minor
Ministers General of the Order of Friars Minor Conventual
American people of Polish descent
Religious leaders from Buffalo, New York
1943 births
Living people